Good Morning World may refer to:
 Good Morning World (American TV series) (1967–1968)
 Good Morning World (Canadian TV series) (2007)